This article is a demography of the population of Belize including population density, ethnicity, education level, health of the populace, economic status, religious affiliations and other aspects of the population.

Belize is the most sparsely populated nation in Central America. It is larger than El Salvador. Slightly more than half of the people live in rural areas. About one-fourth live in Belize City, the principal port, commercial centre, and former capital. About 80% of the population are Christian.

Most Belizeans are of multiracial descent. About 52.9% of the population is of mixed Indigenous (mostly Maya) and European descent (or Mestizo), 24.9% are Kriols, about 10.6% are Maya, and about 6.1% are Afro-Amerindian (Garifuna). The remaining population includes European, East Indian, Chinese, Middle Eastern, and North American groups. In the case of Europeans, most are descendants of Spanish and British colonial settlers, whether pure-blooded or mixed with each other. Most Spanish left the nation just after it was taken by the British colonists who, in the same way, left after independence. Dutch and Prussian Mennonites settled in Belize, mostly in isolated areas.

Belize's largest cities and towns by population

Belize City, BZ - 67,169
San Ignacio, CY - 27,878
Belmopan, CY - 19,931
Orange Walk Town, OW - 16,709
Corozal Town, CZ - 13,400
San Pedro, BZ - 11,765
Dangriga, SC - 9,591
Benque Viejo del Carmen, CY - 6,148
Punta Gorda, TO - 6,351
- Based on 2010 census.

Population
According to the Statistical Institute of Belize, the current population stands at 441,471.

In conjunction with a census of the British Empire, census data was compiled for Belize in 1790, 1816, 1823, 1826, 1829, 1832, 1835, 1861, 1871, 1881, 1891, 1901, 1911, 1921, 1931 and 1946.  Belize conducted its own censuses in 1960, 1970, 1980, 1991, 2000, 2010, and 2022. The results of the 2022 census are scheduled to be published by October 1, 2023.

Ethnic groups
Most Belizeans are of multiracial descent. About 52.9% are Mestizo, 25.9% Creole, 11.3% Maya, 6.1.% Garifuna, 3.9% East Indian,  3.6% Mennonites, 1.2% White, 1% Asian, 1.2% Other and 0.3% Unknown.

Most Europeans are descendants of Spanish and British colonial settlers. Most Spanish left the nation just after it was taken by the British colonists who, in the same way, left after independence. Beginning in 1958, Plautdietsch-speaking Mennonites of "Russian" Mennonite and Pennsylvania Dutch heritage settled in Belize, mostly in isolated areas.

Maya 
Because Belize's original Maya peoples were decimated by disease and wars or fled to Mexico and Guatemala, most of the country's Maya today are descended from other groups. The current Maya population consists mainly of three language groups.  The Yucatec fled to Belize in the late 1840s to escape the Caste War in Yucatán, Mexico.  Their descendants live in the Orange Walk and Corozal districts, which border on Mexico. Before the massive migration of Yucatec Maya from Mexico to Belize, a local Yucatec Maya group named the Iciache Maya already inhabited the land. Today most Yucatec Maya work in the sugar cane industry. In the 1870s-1880s, many Q'eqchi' fled from Alta Verapaz, Guatemala, where their communal land were seizured for coffee plantations, where they were forced into service. They settled villages in the Toledo district.

Living near rivers and streams, they are primarily farmers, though many younger people now work in tourism, and on shrimp, banana and citrus plantations. The Mopans originated in Belize, but most were driven out to Guatemala after the British displaced Spanish in a struggle that took most of the 18th century.  They returned to Belize in 1886, running from enslavement and taxation in Petén. The Cayo district and San Antonio in the Toledo district are their homes now. Q'eqchi' and Mopan have intermarried, though the two languages remain distinct and mutually unintelligible. Mopan and Yucatec are mutually intelligible.

Birth Rate per 1,000 population by Ethnic Groups (2000 Census)

Vital statistics

Languages

English is the only official language of Belize, a relic of past British colonization. It is the main language used in government and education.  Although only 5.6% of the population speaks it as the main language at home, 54% can speak it very well, and another 26% can speak some English. 37% of Belizeans consider their primary language to be Kriol, an English-based creole of words and syntax from various African languages (namely Akan, Igbo, and Twi), and other languages (Miskito, Caliche). It is also a second or third language for another 40% of the multilingual country.

Kriol shares similarities with many Caribbean English Creoles as far as phonology and pronunciations are concerned. Also, many of its words and structures are both lexically and phonologically similar to English, its superstrate language. Because it is English-based, all Kriol speakers can understand English. A number of linguists classify Belizean Kriol as a separate language, while others consider it to be a dialect of English.

Spanish is the mother tongue of Mestizo and Central American refugees and is commonly spoken at home by 43% of the population. Maya dialects such as Q'eqchi', Mopan and Yucatec are spoken. Garifuna (which is Arawakan/Maipurean based, with elements of the Carib language, French, and Spanish) and the Plautdietsch and Pennsylvania German dialects of the Mennonites are spoken as well. Literacy currently stands at nearly 80%. In 2001, UNESCO declared the Garifuna language, dance, and music a "Masterpiece of the Oral and Intangible Heritage of Humanity". English is the primary language of public education, with Spanish taught in primary and secondary school as well. Bilingualism is highly encouraged, and therefore, very common.

Religion

According to the 2010 census Catholics constitute 40.0% of the population of Belize, down from 49.6% in 2000 and 57.7% in 1991; Protestants constitute 31.7% of the population, with a slight growth in percentage for some groups since 2000 (8.5% Pentecostal; 5.5% Adventist; 4.6% Anglican; 3.8% Mennonite; 3.6% Baptist; 2.9% Methodist; 2.8% Nazarene); Jehovah's Witnesses are 1.7% of the population. 10.2% of Belizeans follow other religions (with a growth in percentage since 2000); amongst these there are followers of the indigenous Maya religion, Garifuna religion, Obeah and Myalism, and minorities of Mormons, Hindus, Buddhists, Muslims, Baháʼís, Rastafarians and other. The Mennonites, of German descent, live mostly in the rural districts of Cayo and Orange Walk. 15.6% of the Belizean population do not adhere to any religion, up from 9.4% in 2000.

Belizean Roman Catholic churches belong to the Diocese of Belize City-Belmopan; Anglican churches belong to the Diocese of Belize, part of the Church in the Province of the West Indies. Hinduism is followed by most Indian immigrants, while Islam is common among Middle Eastern immigrants and has gained a following among some Kriols. Catholics frequently visit the country for special gospel revivals. The Greek Orthodox Church has a presence in Santa Elena.

The Constitution of Belize provides for freedom of religion, and other laws and policies contribute to the generally free practice of religion. The Government at all levels protects this right in full against abuse, either by governmental or private actors. The Government generally respects religious freedom in practice. In 2008, the U.S. government received no reports of societal abuses or discrimination based on religious affiliation, belief, or practice.

Structure of the population

Life expectancy at birth 

Source: UN World Population Prospects

Other demographics statistics
Demographic statistics according to the World Population Review in 2022.

One birth every 65 minutes	
One death every 288 minutes	
One net migrant every 480 minutes	
Net gain of one person every 72 minutes

Demographic statistics according to the CIA World Factbook, unless otherwise indicated.

Population
412,387 (2022 est.)
385,854 (July 2018 est.)

Ethnic groups
Mestizo 52.9%, Creole 25.9%, Maya 11.3%, Garifuna 6.1%, East Indian 3.9%, Mennonite 3.6%, White 1.2%, Asian 1%, other 1.2%, unknown 0.3% (2010 est.)

note: percentages add up to more than 100% because respondents were able to identify more than one ethnic origin

Languages
English 62.9% (official), Spanish 56.6%, Creole 44.6%, Maya 10.5%, German 3.2%, Garifuna 2.9%, other 1.8%, unknown 0.3%, none 0.2% (cannot speak) (2010 est.)
note: shares sum to more than 100% because some respondents gave more than one answer on the census

Age structure 

0-14 years: 32.57% (male 66,454/female 63,700)
15-24 years: 19% (male 39,238/female 36,683)
25-54 years: 37.72% (male 73,440/female 77,300)
55-64 years: 6.18% (male 12,235/female 12,444)
65 years and over: 4.53% (male 8,781/female 9,323) (2020 est.)

0-14 years: 33.61% (male 66,207 /female 63,466)
15-24 years: 18.74% (male 37,184 /female 35,127)
25-54 years: 37.43% (male 70,222 /female 74,187)
55-64 years: 5.88% (male 11,397 /female 11,284)
65 years and over: 4.35% (male 8,293 /female 8,487) (2018 est.)

Median age
total: 23.9 years. Country comparison to the world: 172nd
male: 23 years
female: 24.8 years (2020 est.)

total: 23.7 years. Country comparison to the world: 168th
male: 23.2 years 
female: 24.4 years (2018 est.)

Birth rate
21.28 births/1,000 population (2022 est.) Country comparison to the world: 64th
22.9 births/1,000 population (2018 est.) Country comparison to the world: 63rd

Death rate
3.94 deaths/1,000 population (2022 est.) Country comparison to the world: 216th
4.2 deaths/1,000 population (2018 est.) Country comparison to the world: 206th

Total fertility rate
2.62 children born/woman (2022 est.) Country comparison to the world: 64th
2.8 children born/woman (2018 est.) Country comparison to the world: 60th

Net migration rate
-0.96 migrant(s)/1,000 population (2022 est.) Country comparison to the world: 143rd
-0.6 migrant(s)/1,000 population (2018 est.) Country comparison to the world: 129th

Population growth rate
1.64% (2022 est.) Country comparison to the world: 58th
1.8% (2018 est.) Country comparison to the world: 57th

Contraceptive prevalence rate
51.4% (2015/16)

Dependency ratios 
total dependency ratio: 56.8 (2015 est.)
youth dependency ratio: 50.9 (2015 est.)
elderly dependency ratio: 5.9 (2015 est.)
potential support ratio: 17 (2015 est.)

Religions
Roman Catholic 40.1%, Protestant 31.5% (includes Pentecostal 8.4%, Seventh Day Adventist 5.4%, Anglican 4.7%, Mennonite 3.7%, Baptist 3.6%, Methodist 2.9%, Nazarene 2.8%), Jehovah's Witness 1.7%, other 10.5% (includes Baháʼí, Buddhist, Hindu, Mormon, Muslim, Rastafarian, Salvation Army), unspecified 0.6%, none 15.5% (2010 est.)

Life expectancy at birth 
total population: 75.82 years. Country comparison to the world: 114th
male: 74.23 years
female: 77.5 years (2022 est.)

total population: 74.7 years
male: 73.1 years 
female: 76.3 years (2018 est.)

Urbanization
urban population: 46.4% of total population (2022)
rate of urbanization: 2.3% annual rate of change (2020-25 est.)

urban population: 45.7% of total population (2018)
rate of urbanization: 2.32% annual rate of change (2015-20 est.)

Education expenditures
7.9% of GDP (2020) Country comparison to the world: 11st

School life expectancy (primary to tertiary education)
total: 13 years 
male: 13 years 
female: 13 years (2020)

Unemployment, youth ages 15–24
total: 19.3%
male: 12.7%
female: 28.5% (2019 est.)

See also
Kriols
Garifuna people
Maya peoples
Mennonites in Belize
Indians in Belize
Ethnic groups in Central America

References

External links
Q'eqchi' and Mopan history - Maya history by Native Planet